This article includes a list of U.S. states sorted by birth and death rate, expressed per 1,000 inhabitants, for 2021, using the most recent data available from the U.S. National Center for Health Statistics.



2021 list

See also
List of U.S. states and territories by fertility rate

References 

Birth and death rates
States and territories by birth and death rates
United States demography-related lists
Ranked lists of country subdivisions